Ludwig Landmann (18 May 1868 – 5 March 1945) was a liberal German politician of the Weimar Republic. Landmann belonged first to the National Social party, then the Progressive People's Party, and finally, after the German revolution of 1918, the German Democratic Party.

He eventually moved from Mannheim to Frankfurt, where he became Mayor of Frankfurt from 1924 until 1933 and led a significant expansion of the city. Through reorganizations and construction, Landmann gave the city new luster. Landmann was the first Jewish mayor of Frankfurt.

At the time he was mayor he hired the architect Ernst May to organize a new housing project, which became known as the New Frankfurt (Neues Frankfurt). Landmann founded also the Nassau home (Nassauische Heimstätte), an organization that helped guarantee every citizen had access to decent housing.

After the Nazi election victory in the municipal elections on 12 March 1933, he was expelled from his office. He then handed in his official resignation as mayor. He was succeeded by Friedrich Krebs of the NSDAP.

Landmann left then for Berlin. But because of his Jewish ancestry, he was exposed to various antisemitic Nazi harassment; among other things, his pension payments were temporarily stopped. In 1939, he left Germany and emigrated to the Netherlands, the home of his wife. After the German occupation of the Netherlands from 1940, he was hidden by relatives and friends to protect him from deportation, and possible death. He died in 1945 in hiding from malnutrition during Holland's 'Hunger Winter'.

Today Ludwig Landmann Street in Frankfurt is dedicated to his memory. A portrait of the mayor by William Runze, a painter from the Sossenheim district of Frankfurt, hangs in the Council Hall at the Römer, Frankfurt's City Hall.

References 

Sources
Dieter Rebentisch. Ludwig Landmann. Frankfurter Oberbürgermeister der Weimarer Republik. Wiesbaden 1975,  (basing on Rebentischs dissertation, University of Frankfurt am Main, 1970) 

Politicians from Mannheim
People from Hesse-Nassau
1868 births
1945 deaths
Mayors of Frankfurt
Burials at Frankfurt Main Cemetery
Jewish emigrants from Nazi Germany to the Netherlands
Deaths by starvation
German Jews who died in the Holocaust